Margus Kuul (born 6 July 1979) is an Estonian military personnel (Lieutenant Colonel).

Since 2019, he is the commander of Estonian Special Operations Force.

In 2009, he was awarded by the Order of the Cross of the Eagle, V Class.

References

1979 births
Living people
Estonian military officers
21st-century Estonian military personnel
Recipients of the Military Order of the Cross of the Eagle, Class V